Anthony Adderley "Garrincha" (born 5 May 1968) is a Belizean football and manager. He later went on to manage the national team.

He was a talented player who played for Berger 404 in Belize. He was one of the founding members of the Football federations of Belize.

References

External links

1968 births
Living people
Belizean footballers
Belizean football managers
Association footballers not categorized by position
Belize national football team managers